Berytos Airlines was an airline based in Hazmieh, Lebanon.

History and profile
The airline was established in 2003 and operated ad hoc charter flights. In 2008, it was closed down.

Fleet
In 2005, Khors Aircompany wet leased a McDonnell Douglas DC-9-50 to the airline.

References

External links
Berytos Airlines (website under construction)

Defunct airlines of Lebanon
Airlines established in 2003
Airlines disestablished in 2008
2003 establishments in Lebanon
2008 disestablishments in Lebanon